The 1930 Akron Zippers football team was an American football team that represented the University of Akron in the Ohio Athletic Conference (OAC) during the 1930 college football season. In its fourth season under head coach Red Blair, the team compiled a 7–1 record (5–1 in conference), shut out five of eight opponents, and outscored all opponents by a total of 130 to 38. Halfback Kenneth "Red" Cochrane was the team captain.

Schedule

References

Akron
Akron Zips football seasons
Akron Zippers football